The 2022 WNBA season was the 25th season for the Phoenix Mercury of the Women's National Basketball Association. The season began on May 6, 2022, against the Las Vegas Aces and ended in the 1st round of the WNBA Playoffs against the same team. The season was marred by a number of issues, including injuries and the absence of Brittney Griner, who was detained in Russia on drug charges.

On December 6, 2021, the Mercury announced that they would not be renewing Sandy Brondello's contract and parted ways with her as Head Coach.  On January 24, 2022, the Mercury announced that Vanessa Nygaard had been hired as Brondello's replacement.

The Mercury got off to a quick start to the season, winning two of their first three games.  However, that momentum did not last as they then went on a seven game losing streak.  They ended May 2–7.  They were able to end their losing streak in June and win four of their first six games that month.  However, they lost three and won three of their final six to end the month 7–5.  July was another up and down month as the team struggled to build momentum and couldn't build a streak.  They finished the month 4–5. Diana Taurasi suffered a quad strain during their game against the Connecticut Sun on August 2. The Mercury announced that she would miss the rest of the regular season with the injury. On August 11, 2022, the Mercury announced that Skylar Diggins-Smith would miss the final 3 games of the season due to personal reasons.  Despite injuries to two of their prominent players, the Mercury entered the final day of the season with a chance at qualifying for the playoffs.  Despite a final day loss and a 2–4 August record, the Mercury finished in eighth place in the standings and qualified for the final playoff spot.

The Mercury faced first seed Las Vegas in First Round of the playoffs.  The first two games of the series were in Las Vegas and the Mercury lost both games, preventing the series from returning to Phoenix.  Neither game was close with the Mercury losing by sixteen points in Game One and thirty-seven points in Game Two.

Transactions

WNBA Draft

Trades and Roster Changes

Roster

Depth

Schedule

Preseason

|- style="background:#fcc;"
| 1
| April 28
| Seattle
| L 78–82
| Tina Charles (16)
| Kristine Anigwe (8)
| Skylar Diggins-Smith (8)
| Footprint Center2,759
| 0–1
|- style="background:#fcc;"
| 2
| April 30
| @ Los Angeles
| L 84–87
| Kiana Williams (25)
| Kristine Anigwe (11)
| CannonSimms (3)
| MatadomeN/A
| 0–2

Regular Season

|- style="background:#fcc;"
| 1
| May 6
| Las Vegas
| L 88–106
| Skylar Diggins-Smith (25)
| TaurasiSimms (4)
| Diana Taurasi (9)
| Footprint Center7,167
| 0–1
|- style="background:#cfc;"
| 2
| May 11
| Seattle
| W 97–77
| Tina Charles (22)
| Tina Charles (11)
| Diggins-SmithPeddy (6)
| Footprint Center6,098
| 1–1
|- style="background:#cfc;"
| 3
| May 14
| @ Seattle
| W 69–64
| Diana Taurasi (24)
| Brianna Turner (14)
| Skylar Diggins-Smith (5)
| Climate Pledge Arena12,453
| 2–1
|- style="background:#fcc;"
| 4
| May 17
| @ Las Vegas
| L 74–86
| Tina Charles (17)
| Tina Charles (9)
| Skylar Diggins-Smith (6)
| Michelob Ultra Arena2,536
| 2–2
|- style="background:#fcc;"
| 5
| May 19
| Dallas
| L 84–94
| Diamond DeShields (22)
| Tina Charles (11)
| Shey Peddy (5)
| Footprint Center6,151
| 2–3
|- style="background:#fcc;"
| 6
| May 21
| @ Las Vegas
| L 80–100
| Diamond DeShields (19)
| Brianna Turner (8)
| Diana Taurasi (7)
| Michelob Ultra Arena5,572
| 2–4
|- style="background:#fcc;"
| 7
| May 25
| @ Los Angeles
| L 94–99
| Skylar Diggins-Smith (28)
| Tina Charles (7)
| Diamond DeShields (9)
| Crypto.com Arena4,020
| 2–5
|- style="background:#fcc;"
| 8
| May 29
| @ Atlanta
| L 54–81
| Diamond DeShields (23)
| Brianna Turner (8)
| Skylar Diggins-Smith (5)
| Gateway Center Arena3,138
| 2–6
|- style="background:#fcc;"
| 9
| May 31
| @ Chicago
| L 70–73
| Tina Charles (25)
| Brianna Turner (9)
| Skylar Diggins-Smith (8)
| Wintrust Arena5,133
| 2–7
|-

|- style="background:#fcc;"
| 10
| June 3
| Connecticut
| L 88–92
| Diana Taurasi (32)
| Skylar Diggins-Smith (6)
| Skylar Diggins-Smith (6)
| Footprint Center7,180
| 2–8
|- style="background:#cfc;"
| 11
| June 5
| Los Angeles
| W 81–74
| Skylar Diggins-Smith (29)
| Brianna Turner (9)
| Diana Taurasi (7)
| Footprint Center10,151
| 3–8
|- style="background:#cfc;"
| 12
| June 10
| Atlanta
| W 90–88
| Diana Taurasi (23)
| Brianna Turner (13)
| Diana Taurasi (6)
| Footprint Center7,650
| 4–8
|- style="background:#cfc;"
| 13
| June 12
| @ Washington
| W 99–90 (OT)
| Skylar Diggins-Smith (27)
| Brianna Turner (10)
| Diana Taurasi (7)
| Entertainment and Sports Arena4,200
| 5–8
|- style="background:#fcc;"
| 14
| June 14
| @ Washington
| L 65–83
| Diamond DeShields (21)
| Diamond DeShields (8)
| Skylar Diggins-Smith (8)
| Entertainment and Sports Arena3,088
| 5–9
|- style="background:#cfc;"
| 15
| June 15
| @ Indiana
| W 93–80
| Tina Charles (29)
| Brianna Turner (10)
| Shey Peddy (7)
| Indiana Farmers Coliseum1,824
| 6–9
|- style="background:#fcc;"
| 16
| June 17
| @ Dallas
| L 88–93
| Tina Charles (27)
| Tina Charles (9)
| Skylar Diggins-Smith (10)
| College Park Center3,140
| 6–10
|- style="background:#fcc;"
| 17
| June 21
| Minnesota
| L 71–84
| Skylar Diggins-Smith (25)
| Tina Charles (7)
| Skylar Diggins-Smith (6)
| Footprint Center6,394
| 6–11
|- style="background:#fcc;"
| 18
| June 23
| @ Minnesota
| L 88–100
| Tina Charles (26)
| Brianna Turner (8)
| Skylar Diggins-Smith (5)
| Target Center8,004
| 6–12
|- style="background:#cfc;"
| 19
| June 25
| @ Dallas
| W 83–72
| Skylar Diggins-Smith (26)
| Diamond DeShields (10)
| Shey Peddy (6)
| College Park Center4,240
| 7–12
|- style="background:#cfc;"
| 20
| June 27
| Indiana
| W 83–71
| Diana Taurasi (27)
| Brianna Turner (8)
| Shey Peddy (5)
| Footprint Center5,044
| 8–12
|- style="background:#cfc;"
| 21
| June 29
| Indiana
| W 99–78
| Skylar Diggins-Smith (17)
| Brianna Turner (11)
| Diggins-SmithTaurasi (7)
| Footprint Center5,833
| 9–12
|-

|- style="background:#fcc;"
| 22
| July 2
| @ Chicago
| L 75–91
| Skylar Diggins-Smith (25)
| Diamond DeShields (9)
| Shey Peddy (6)
| Wintrust Arena8,028
| 9–13
|- style="background:#fcc;"
| 23
| July 4
| @ Los Angeles
| L 75–78
| Skylar Diggins-Smith (22)
| CunninghamPeddy (6)
| Diana Taurasi (6)
| Crypto.com Arena3,340
| 9–14
|- style="background:#cfc;"
| 24
| July 7
| New York
| W 84–81
| CunninghamTaurasi (23)
| Skylar Diggins-Smith (7)
| Skylar Diggins-Smith (9)
| Footprint Center6,158
| 10–14
|- style="background:#fcc;"
| 25
| July 12
| @ Minnesota
| L 107–118 (2OT)
| Sophie Cunningham (36)
| Shey Peddy (10)
| Skylar Diggins-Smith (10)
| Target Center6,503
| 10–15
|- style="background:#cfc;"
| 26
| July 14
| Washington
| W 80–75
| Skylar Diggins-Smith (29)
| CunninghamTaurasi (7)
| Skylar Diggins-Smith (9)
| Footprint Center5,994
| 11–15
|- style="background:#fcc;"
| 27
| July 17
| Atlanta
| L 75–85
| Diana Taurasi (23)
| Sophie Cunningham (9)
| Shey Peddy (5)
| Footprint Center7,963
| 11–16
|- style="background:#cfc;"
| 28
| July 22
| Seattle
| W 94–78
| Skylar Diggins-Smith (35)
| PeddyTaurasi (7)
| Diana Taurasi (7)
| Footprint Center14,162
| 12–16
|- style="background:#cfc;"
| 29
| July 28
| Los Angeles
| W 90–80
| Diana Taurasi (30)
| Brianna Turner (7)
| Skylar Diggins-Smith (6)
| Footprint Center8,124
| 13–16
|- style="background:#fcc;"
| 30
| July 31
| @ New York
| L 69–89
| Sophie Cunningham (21)
| Shey Peddy (12)
| Skylar Diggins-Smith (11)
| Barclays Center6,433
| 13–17
|-

|- style="background:#fcc;"
| 31
| August 2
| @ Connecticut
| L 63–87
| CunninghamDiggins-Smith (15)
| Brianna Turner (6)
| Diggins-SmithPeddy (4)
| Mohegan Sun Arena6,130
| 13–18
|- style="background:#fcc;"
| 32
| August 4
| @ Connecticut
| L 64–77
| Skylar Diggins-Smith (16)
| Brianna Turner (12)
| Brianna Turner (7)
| Mohegan Sun Arena6,215
| 13–19
|- style="background:#cfc;"
| 33
| August 6
| New York
| W 76–62
| Diamond DeShields (25)
| CunninghamDeShieldsSimms (8)
| Brianna Turner (4)
| Footprint Center11,724
| 14–19
|- style="background:#fcc;"
| 34
| August 10
| Minnesota
| L 77–86
| Sophie Cunningham (24)
| Shey Peddy (10)
| Diamond DeShields (10)
| Footprint Center7,307
| 14–20
|- style="background:#cfc;"
| 35
| August 12
| Dallas
| W 86–74
| Diamond DeShields (24)
| CunninghamDeShieldsPeddy (5)
| Shey Peddy (8)
| Footprint Center8,047
| 15–20
|- style="background:#fcc;"
| 36
| August 14
| Chicago
| L 67–82
| GustafsonSimms (12)
| Megan Gustafson (10)
| Yvonne Turner (4)
| Footprint Center12,383
| 15–21
|-

Playoffs 

|- style="background:#fcc;"
| 1
| August 18
| @ Las Vegas
| L 63–79
| Diamond DeShields (18)
| Brianna Turner (16)
| Shey Peddy (5)
| Michelob Ultra Arena8,725
| 0–1
|-  style="background:#fcc;"
| 2
| August 21
| @ Las Vegas
| L 80-117
| Kaela Davis (23)
| Brianna Turner (7)
| B. TurnerSimmsDavisGustafson (3)
| Michelob Ultra Arena9,126
| 0–2
|-

Standings

Playoffs

Statistics

Regular Season

‡Waived/Released during the season
†Traded during the season
≠Acquired during the season

Playoffs

Awards and Honors

References

External links

Phoenix Mercury seasons
Phoenix Mercury
Phoenix Mercury